Chayanta is a province in the northern parts of the Bolivian Potosí Department. Its capital is Colquechaca.

Location
Chayanta province is one of sixteen provinces in the Potosí Department. It is located between 18° 23' and 19° 6' South and between 65° 23' and 66° 19' West.

It borders Charcas Province in the north, Rafael Bustillo Province in the northwest, Oruro Department in the west, Tomás Frías Province in the south, Cornelio Saavedra Province in the southeast, and Chuquisaca Department in the east. The province extends over 125 km from east to west and 100 km from north to south.

Geography 
Some of the highest mountains of the province are listed below:

History
In the late eighteenth century the province was the scene of a rebellion of the Aymara-speaking population led by Tomás Katari and exacerbated by his assassination in January 1781. It was also the scene of a peasant rebellion in 1927.

Division 
The province comprises four municipalities, which are partly further subdivided into cantons.

Population
The main language of the province is Quechua, spoken by 79%, while 33% of the population speak Spanish. The population increased from 73,128 inhabitants (1992 census) to 90,205 (2001 census), an increase of 23.4%. The capital of the province is Colquechaca.

97% of the population have no access to electricity, 98% have no sanitary facilities.

74% of the population are employed in agriculture, 1% in mining, 13% in industry, 12% in general services. 93% of the population are Catholics, 5% Protestants.

The people are predominantly indigenous citizens of Quechua descent.

Literature
Sergio Serulnikov, Subverting Colonial Authority: Challenges to Spanish Rule in Eighteenth-Century Southern Andes (Durham: Duke University Press, 2003)
Sergio Serulnikov, Tomás Catari y la producción de justicia (Buenos Aires: CEDES, 1988)
Erick D. Langer, "Andean Rituals of Revolt: The Chayanta Rebellion of 1927," Ethnohistory 37(1990): 227–53
Tristan Platt, Estado boliviano y ayllu andino: tierra y tributo en el norte de Potosi (Lima: Instituto de Estudios Peruanos, 1982)

References 

Population data (Spanish)

See also 
 Q'ara Quta

 

Provinces of Potosí Department